A New Romance of Celluloid: The Miracle of Sound is a 1940 short documentary film, presented and directed by MGM sound engineer Douglas Shearer and narrated by Frank Whitbeck, which goes behind the scenes to look at how the sound portion of a talking picture is created. The film, which was produced as part of the studio's Romance of Celluloid series, is available as a bonus on the Warner DVD of The Shop Around the Corner.

Synopsis
The film starts with a brief introduction to the work of Thomas A. Edison and a clip from William K.L. Dickson's  The Dickson Experimental Sound Film (c. 1894). Douglas Shearer then presents a behind the scenes look at the filming of W.S. Van Dyke's Bitter Sweet (1940) featuring Jeanette MacDonald and Nelson Eddy to explain how the sound is recorded. A scene from King Vidor's Comrade X (1940) featuring Clark Gable and Hedy Lamarr is used to demonstrate the final result. The film concludes with a montage from trailers for coming MGM pictures and a Technicolor screen test of Greer Garson for Mervyn LeRoy's Blossoms in the Dust (1941).

Production
The film was shot on location at the Metro-Goldwyn-Mayer Studios in Culver City, California.

References

External links
 

1940 films
Metro-Goldwyn-Mayer short films
Documentary films about Hollywood, Los Angeles
American black-and-white films
American short documentary films
1940s short documentary films
1940s English-language films
1940s American films